Her Friend the Bandit  is a 1914 American comedy silent film made by Keystone Studios starring Charles Chaplin and Mabel Normand, both of whom co-directed the movie. It is considered lost.

Synopsis
Charlie plays an elegant bandit with whom Mabel has a flirtation. Mabel hosts a party.  Charlie attends as a French count (Count de Beans).  Charlie's uncouth behavior shocks the other party guests.  The Keystone Cops eventually are summoned and remove Charlie from the party.

Chaplin's lost films
Her Friend the Bandit and A Woman of the Sea are Chaplin's lost films, as no copy is known to exist.  As more and more supposedly 'lost' silent films emerge, there is some hope that a copy of Her Friend the Bandit will surface in a private collection somewhere.  As late as 1965, five of Chaplin's early comedies for Keystone were considered forever lost.  Copies of four of them have surfaced in the intervening decades.  Her Friend the Bandit is still considered Chaplin’s only 'lost' Keystone film.

Reviews
From the Lexington Herald in Lexington, Kentucky (June 7, 1914): "'Her Friend, the Bandit', Keystone. One of the funniest and most hilarious comedies in a decade, with a conglomeration of mirth-provoking scenes."

From The Oregonian in Portland, Oregon (June 14, 1914): "The Keystone players will offer 'Her Friend, the Bandit', one of those rough and ready farces that make everybody laugh."

Cast
 Charles Chaplin as Bandit
 Mabel Normand as Mabel
 Charles Murray as Count de Beans

See also
 List of American films of 1914
 List of lost films
 The Professor - a 1919 film by Chaplin that was never released.
 A Woman of the Sea - a 1926 film by Chaplin that was never released, and destroyed by Chaplin himself in the 1930s as a tax writeoff.

References

External links

1914 films
Silent American comedy films
1914 comedy films
Short films directed by Charlie Chaplin
Films directed by Mabel Normand
Films produced by Mack Sennett
American black-and-white films
American silent short films
Lost American films
Keystone Studios films
1914 short films
American comedy short films
1914 lost films
Lost comedy films
1910s American films